William Burton Conyngham (1733 – 31 May 1796) was an Irish politician and improver.

Life
He was born William Burton, the second son of Francis Burton and Mary Conyngham, sister of Henry Conyngham, 1st Earl Conyngham. In 1781, his name was changed by Royal Licence to inherit the estates of his uncle.

Conyngham was a longtime Member of Parliament. From 1761 to 1777 he represented Newtown Limavady, from 1776 to 1777 as well as from 1783 to 1790 Killybegs. Between 1776 and 1783 and again between 1790 and 1796, he sat in the Irish House of Commons for Ennis.

Conyngham planned a settlement on the previously unpopulated island of Rutland, Ireland, having installed, from 1784, a street of residences and business premises, post office, school house and a fish landing and processing facility. The island remained inhabited into the 1960s. The village which developed around the mainland pier which served Rutland, Burtonport, still bears his name.

In 1785 Conyngham commenced the building of Slane Castle, assisted by his nephew the 1st Marquess Conyngham, on a site overlooking the River Boyne just a few kilometres upstream from the site of the Battle of the Boyne.

From 1793 Conyngham was one of the Commissioners of the Treasury for Ireland.

Conyngham is most famous today for having presented the Trinity College Harp to Trinity College Dublin; from 1922 the harp was used as the model for the insignia of the Irish Free State and the Republic of Ireland. An image was also registered as a Guinness trade mark in 1876.

References

1733 births
1796 deaths
Irish MPs 1761–1768
Irish MPs 1769–1776
Irish MPs 1776–1783
Irish MPs 1783–1790
Irish MPs 1790–1797
Members of the Privy Council of Ireland
William
Commissioners of the Treasury for Ireland
Members of the Parliament of Ireland (pre-1801) for County Londonderry constituencies
Members of the Parliament of Ireland (pre-1801) for County Donegal constituencies
Members of the Parliament of Ireland (pre-1801) for County Clare constituencies